Ray Taylor (June 4, 1923 – March 24, 2015) was an American politician in the state of Iowa.

Taylor was born in Steamboat Rock, Iowa. He attended Baylor University and the University of Northern Iowa and was a farmer and retailer. He served in the Iowa State Senate from 1973 to 1995 as a Republican.

References

1923 births
2015 deaths
People from Hardin County, Iowa
Baylor University alumni
University of Northern Iowa alumni
Businesspeople from Iowa
Farmers from Iowa
Republican Party Iowa state senators
20th-century American businesspeople